The 9th Alabama Infantry Regiment was an infantry regiment that served in the Confederate Army during the American Civil War.

Service
The 9th Alabama Infantry Regiment was mustered in at Richmond, Virginia in late May 1861.

The regiment surrendered  at Appomattox Court House.

Total strength and casualties
The 9th mustered 1138 men during its existence.  It suffered approximately 200 killed in action or mortally wounded and 175 men who died of disease, for a total of approximately 375 fatalities.  An additional 208 men were discharged or transferred from the regiment.

Commanders
 Colonel Cadmus Marcellus Wilcox
 Colonel Samuel Henry
 Colonel Joseph Horace King
 Colonel Gaines Chism Smith

See also
Alabama Civil War Confederate Units
Alabama in the American Civil War

Notes

References

Units and formations of the Confederate States Army from Alabama
1861 establishments in Alabama
Military units and formations established in 1861